Heroes' Square, Heldenplatz,  Hősök tere, or Piazzale degli Eroi may refer to:
 Heldenplatz, Vienna, Austria
 National Heroes Square or Trafalgar Square, Bridgetown, Barbados
 Hősök tere, Budapest, Hungary
 Hősök tere (Budapest Metro)
 Heroes' Square, Downtown Miskolc, Hungary
 Piazzale degli Eroi, the terminus of the Aqueduct of Peschiera, Rome, Italy